Woodson Mountain, or widely known as Mount Woodson is a mountain near Poway, California and is known for Potato Chip Rock which located to the west of the summit.

History 
The Kumeyaay call this mountain Ewiiy Hellyaa, meaning the 'Mountain of the Moonlit Rocks', which was considered a place of power where the Moon sleeps. It is also associated with a mythical rabbit and the story of Toyapai, a Kumeyaay sprit giant who stepped on the southern side of the mountain on the way to the coast. Pioneers passing through the area called it Cobbleback Peak.

The mountain was renamed as Woodson Mountain in honor of Confederate dentist Dr. Marshall Clay Woodson, who moved into the area in 1895.

The mountain became popular in the 2010s as Potato Chip Rock became more widely known through the influence of social media platforms such as Instagram.

Potato Chip Rock 

The hike to the rock takes approximately three to four hours. Potato Chip Rock sits 100 yards below the summit. One popular way to reach the rock is through a 6.6-mile round trip hike from the Lake Poway trailhead to the west. There are two other popular routes to the top that start on the east side of Mount Woodson. A short route begins from free parking areas along Route 67 and takes Mt. Woodson Road up to the rock. This 3.75-mile round-trip hike is paved and steep. The Fry-Kogel trail is the third route to the rock, and is about 4 miles each way.

The rock is thin and more than 7 feet long, and it looks as if it is about to fall.

The rock was used as an April Fools' Day prank by Poway Mayor Steve Vaus in 2017. In a tweet, he wrote that part of the rock had snapped off and added a picture for "proof".

Also located on the trail from Lake Poway to Potato Chip Rock is Sandcrawler Rock, named for its resemblance to the Sandcrawler transport vehicle from the Star Wars Universe.

References 

Mountains of San Diego County, California
Mountains of Southern California